Devaru Kotta Thangi is a 1973 Indian Kannada-language film, directed by K. S. L. Swamy (Ravi) and produced by Sri Raghavendra Productions. The film stars Rajkumar, Jayanthi, Srinath and B. V. Radha. The film has musical score by Vijaya Bhaskar. The movie saw a theatrical run of 17 weeks.

Cast
 Rajkumar as Raghu
 Jayanthi as Shobha
 Srinath as Ramu
 B. V. Radha
 Narasimharaju as Bheema Rao
 Dwarakish as Hanumantha Rao
 Thoogudeepa Srinivas as Kalappa
 Lokanath as Rajappa
 Dr. Sampath Kumaran
 Kunigal Ramanath
 Kalavathi
 M. Jayashree
 M. N. Lakshmi Devi as Nagamma
 B. Jaya as Subbamma

Soundtrack
The music was composed by Vijaya Bhaskar.

References

External links
 
 

1973 films
1970s Kannada-language films
Films scored by Vijaya Bhaskar
Films directed by K. S. L. Swamy